Soda Springs is a set of mineral springs in Tuolumne Meadows, Yosemite National Park. The name is often used interchangeably with Soda Springs Cabin, a log cabin built over the springs.

Drinking the water in the springs is not advised.

Partial history
The original inhabitants were Indigenous Americans, and in 1869, John Muir visited the area, grazing sheep. In 1885, John Baptiste Lembert made a seasonal homestead at Soda Springs, also filing a claim under the Homestead Act. In 1898, John McCauley used the homestead at Soda Springs as a seasonal pasture for his livestock. In 1915, The Sierra Club built Parsons Memorial Lodge at Soda Springs.

References

External links
 Trail information from the National Park Service
 Trail information from Outdoor Project
 History of Tuolumne Meadows

Yosemite National Park
Springs of California